Functional movements are movements based on real-world situational biomechanics. They usually involve multi-planar, multi-joint movements which place demand on the body's core musculature and innervation.

Functional vs other movements

Sports-specific 

Sports-specific movements, such as a tennis swing or bowling a cricket ball, are based on sports-specific situations.  While there is some cross-over application from sports-specific movements (such as running), they are usually so specific that they supersede functional movements in complexity. Yet both sports and functional movements are dependent on the body's core.

Muscle-specific 

Traditional weight-lifting depends on muscle-specific program-design with the goal of muscle-specific hypertrophy.  For example, a concentration biceps curl attempts to isolate the biceps brachii, although by gripping the weight one also engages the wrist flexors.  These exercises tend to be the most far-removed from functional movement, due to their attempt to micromanage the variables acting on the individual muscles.  Functional exercises, on the other hand, attempt to incorporate as many variables as possible (balance, multiple joints, multiple planes of movement), thus decreasing the load on the muscle but increasing the complexity of motor coordination and flexibility.

Biomechanics 

Functional movement usually involves gross motor movement involving the core, which refers to the muscles of the abdomen and spine, such as segmental stabilizers.

See also  

 Functional Movement Systems
 Biomechanics
 Core (anatomy)
 Functional training
 Functional Movement Screen
 Erwan Le Corre, trainer in a form of functional movement known as "MovNat"

External links 

 Lisa Mercer Fitness, "Functional Sports Conditioning:  Bridging the Gap Between Fitness and Athleticism."
Biomechanics
[1] http://www.ptonthenet.com/articles/the-functional-continuum-3251
Motor control